The National Conference of University Professors (NCUP) is an organisation for university professors in the United Kingdom. The present Patron is Pauline Perry, Baroness Perry of Southwark.

NCUP was founded in 1989 by a group of university professors. It is a non-political organisation that aims to promote beneficial developments across United Kingdom universities. Members come from all academic disciplines. According to the membership criteria: 'Full membership is open to all who hold, or have held, the title of Professor, Visiting Professor or Honorary Professor within a recognised University in the United Kingdom for a minimum of one year.  It is also open to Professors of a recognised University from overseas, who are now permanently resident in UK.' and 'Applicants eligible to apply for Associate Membership of NCUP (ANCUP) include: 1. All  Associate Professors, Readers and Principal and Senior Lecturers of a recognised UK University; 2. Other academics who consider themselves to be of equal standing to any of those above.'
The current president is Roger Watson who replaced Janet Wilson who, in turn, succeeded Terence Davis OBE. The current Vice President is George Kernohan.

Publications
NCUP (1990) Quality-Control of Teaching Standards

NCUP (1991) Higher Education: A New Framework

NCUP (1991) The Role of the Professoriate

NCUP (1992) Improving Public Opinion of Universities

NCUP (1993) Commitment to Scholarship and Research in Universities

References

External links 

 Official website

See also 

 American Association of University Professors

Education-related professional associations
Higher education organisations based in the United Kingdom
Organizations established in 1989